David Rambo Becker, or simply David (May 16, 1995, Itapiranga, Santa Catarina, Brazil), is a Brazilian professional footballer who currently plays for Inter de Lages.

Career

Criciúma and U23 Brazilian team
Born in Itapiranga, the westernmost municipality in the Brazilian state of Santa Catarina, David was spotted by a talent hunter, who then introduced him to Criciúma. David was 15 years-old at that time. He debuted in the professional side of Criciúma's in 2015.

While in Criciúma, David was capped for the U23 national Brazilian team, which was getting prepared for the Rio Olympic Games. Besides some titles with Criciúma's U20 teams, David was runners-up in the U20 Copa do Brasil in 2013.

Experience in Mexico
In 2016, David was announced as the new goalkeeper of the Mexican club Reynosa. The announcement occurred in August. Five months later, in January 2017, he was hired by Correcaminos, the second Mexican club in his career.

Inter de Lages and return to Brazil
David returned to Brazil for the 2018 season. In the beginning of the year, he joined Inter de Lages, which plays the state of Santa Catarina's premier state league, as well as the Campeonato Brasileiro Série D, the fourth tier of the Brazilian football league system.

References

1995 births
Living people
Brazilian footballers
Brazilian expatriate footballers
Association football goalkeepers
Criciúma Esporte Clube players
Atlético Reynosa footballers
Correcaminos UAT footballers
Esporte Clube Internacional de Lages players
Paraná Clube players
Clube Atlético Penapolense players
Esporte Clube Água Santa players
Campeonato Brasileiro Série A players
Ascenso MX players
Liga Premier de México players
Brazilian expatriate sportspeople in Mexico
Expatriate footballers in Mexico